The 1932–33 1re série season was the 17th season of the 1re série, the top level of ice hockey in France. Stade Français won their second championship.

Tournament

Semifinals
 Stade Français - Central HC 3:2 OT (0:1, 1:1, 1:0, 1:0)
 Racing Club de France - Chamonix Hockey Club 3:1 (2:0, 0:1, 1:0)

Final
 Stade Français - Racing Club de France 1:0 (1:0, 0:0, 0:0)

External links
Season on hockeyarchives.info

Fra
1932–33 in French ice hockey
Ligue Magnus seasons